The 2018 Plymouth City Council election took place on 3 May 2018 to elect members of Plymouth City Council in England. The election was won by the Labour Party, who gained enough seats to achieve an overall majority and took control of the council.

A coalition of Conservative and UK Independence Party (UKIP) councillors had taken control of the council after the 2016 election, with thirty members in total and a working majority. The three UKIP councillors defected to the Conservative Party in September 2017, giving the Conservatives overall control of the council. The Conservative Party defended twelve seats and Labour defended seven.

Background 
Plymouth City Council held local elections on 3 May 2018 along with councils across England as part of the 2018 local elections. The council elects its councillors in thirds, with a third being up for election every year for three years, with no election in the fourth year. Councillors defending their seats in this election were previously elected in 2014. In that election, nine Conservative candidates, seven Labour candidates and three UKIP candidates were elected.

In September 2017, the three councillors elected as UKIP candidates defected to the Conservative Party. Following the 2016 Plymouth City Council election, the council had been controlled by a coalition of Conservative and UKIP councillors, with thirty members between them. Following the defections of the UKIP councillors, the Conservative Party held an overall majority, with thirty councillors compared to Labour's twenty-seven.

The Local Government Chronicle described Labour as 'well placed to regain control' by winning the seats won by UKIP councillors in 2014. Rob Ford in the Guardian wrote that a Labour victory in Plymouth would help the party 'demonstrate strength in critical English swing areas'. The election was the first in which the Liberal Democrats fielded a candidate in every ward in Plymouth since 2010.

Overall results

|}

Note: All changes in vote share are in comparison to the corresponding 2014 election.

The Labour Party won an overall majority on the council, with 31 of the council's 57 councillors. The party had last had a majority on the council in 2015. Plymouth was the only council Labour gained control of from the Conservatives in the 2018 local elections.

After the previous election, the composition of the council was:

Before this election, the composition of the council was:

After this election, the composition of the council was:

Ward results
Asterisks denote sitting councillors seeking re-election.

Budshead

Compton

Devonport

Drake

Efford and Lipson

Eggbuckland

Ham

Honicknowle

Moor View

Peverell

Plympton Chaddlewood

Plympton St Mary

Plymstock Dunstone

Plymstock Radford

Southway

St Budeaux

St Peter and the Waterfront

Stoke

Sutton and Mount Gould

Aftermath
Following this election, the Labour group had a majority of councillors. This meant that Labour group leader Tudor Evans became the new leader of Plymouth City Council. Leader of the Labour Party Jeremy Corbyn visited Plymouth to celebrate the result. Outgoing council leader Ian Bowyer remained leader of the Conservative group.

Conservative MP for Plymouth Moor View Johnny Mercer said that the result was due to Plymouth voters believing that defence funding was reducing under the Conservatives. Defeated Drake councillor Steve Ricketts wrote that his defeat was due to students voting Labour.

The Herald described the election as voters deserting UKIP, with Plymouth returning to a two-party political system. The newspaper also emphasised Sima Davarian-Dehsorkhe as the best-performing Liberal Democrat candidate, winning more than 10% of the vote in Plymstock Dunstone.

Labour held its seat in a subsequent by-election in Stoke ward, which took place in July 2018.

References

2018 English local elections
2018
2010s in Devon